The  Climber Motor Company was a short lived automobile manufacturer based in Little Rock, Arkansas. Sales were targeted towards the Southern United States such as Mississippi, Oklahoma, Tennessee, as well as Arkansas. It is the only car ever produced in the state of Arkansas.

The Climber Motor Corporation hired George Schoeneck as their Chief Engineer. Schoeneck had previously been involved with the Owen-Schoeneck and Geneva automobiles.

Production started in 1919 with two models - the 4-cylinder Model K and the 6-cylinder Model S. Tourer, roadster and coupe body styles were offered for both models. Prices ranged from $1385 to $2400 for the Model K, and from $2250 to $3250 for the Model S.

Lack of parts and finance led to the company being sold in mid-1924. The New Climber Company built approximately 200 cars from parts that were available, and then the business was wound up.

Part of the Climber Motor Car Factory was listed on the National Register of Historic Places in 2005.

References

External links
Encyclopedia of Arkansas History and Culture article
1920 Model K 4-door touring car

Defunct motor vehicle manufacturers of the United States
Companies based in Little Rock, Arkansas
Vehicle manufacturing companies established in 1919
1919 establishments in Arkansas
Defunct manufacturing companies based in Arkansas